The 2015–16 FIU Panthers women's basketball team represents Florida International University during the 2015–16 NCAA Division I women's basketball season. The Panthers, led by first year head coach Marlin Chinn, play their home games at FIU Arena, and were members of Conference USA. They finished the season 5–26, 5–16 in C-USA play to finish in last place. They advanced to the second round of the C-USA women's tournament to Marshall.

Controversy
On March 11, 2016, FIU fired Chinn for an NCAA improper benefits rules violation, specifically a $600 loan to team captain Destini Feagin to resolve a school debt. The university suspended Chinn two weeks earlier, after Feagin accused Chinn of sexual harassment that persisted throughout the season. FIU subsequently promoted assistant coach Tiara Malcom to head coach on April 8.

Roster

Schedule

|-
!colspan=9 style="background:#002D62; color:#C5960C;"| Non-conference regular season

|-
!colspan=9 style="background:#002D62; color:#C5960C;"| Conference USA regular season

|-
!colspan=9 style="background:#002D62; color:#C5960C;"| Conference USA Women's Tournament

See also
2015–16 FIU Panthers men's basketball team

References

FIU Panthers women's basketball seasons
FIU
FIU Panthers women's basketball team
FIU Panthers women's basketball team